Our Men  is a 2021 French-Belgian drama film, written and directed by Rachel Lang. It stars Louis Garrel, Camille Cottin, Ina Marija Bartaité and Aleksandr Kuznetsov.

It had its world premiere at the Cannes Film Festival in the Directors Fortnight section on 15 July 2021. It released in France on 6 October 2021, by Bac Films.

Cast
 Louis Garrel as Maxime
 Camille Cottin as Céline 
 Ina Marija Bartaité as Nika
 Aleksandr Kuznetsov as Vlad
 Jean Le Peltier as Romain

Production
In January 2018, it was announced Rachel Lang would direct the film, from a screenplay she wrote. In November 2019, it was announced Louis Garrel, Camille Cottin, Ina Marija Bartaité
and Aleksandr Kuznetsov had joined the cast of the film, with Bac Films set to distribute.

Release
It had its world premiere at the Cannes Film Festival in the Directors Fortnight section on 15 July 2021. It released in France on 6 October 2021.

Critical reception
Peter Bradshaw of The Guardian gave the film a four out of five stars writing: "Rachel Lang delivers an unadorned tour de force."

References

External links
 

2021 films
2020s French-language films
2021 war drama films
2021 drama films
Belgian war drama films
French war drama films
2020s French films